The 2021 Virginia House of Delegates election for the 162nd Virginia General Assembly were held on November 2, 2021 to coincide with biennial elections in the U.S. state of Virginia. All 100 Delegates are elected to two-year terms in single-member constituencies. Primary elections took place on June 8. This election coincided with the 2021 Virginia Gubernatorial election, the Lieutenant Gubernatorial election, and lastly, the Attorney General election, all of which were won by Republicans. The upper house of the Virginia General Assembly, the Senate of Virginia, will hold its next election on November 7, 2023.

The results certified on November 15 show Republicans flipping seven seats and regaining a majority in the House of Delegates. All races have been called by the Associated Press.  A recount in the 85th district, which concluded on December 3, showed incumbent Democrat Alex Askew gaining 12 votes, with Republican Karen Greenhalgh still winning by 115 votes. A recount in the 91st district, which concluded on December 8, showed incumbent Democrat Martha Mugler losing by 94 votes to Republican A.C. Cordoza.

Background
Following the 2019 Virginia House of Delegates election, Democrats netted a gain of six seats. As a result, control of the Virginia House of Delegates flipped to Democratic control for the first time since 1999. Upon obtaining control of the chamber, House Democrats elected Eileen Filler-Corn as Speaker making her the first female Speaker in the history of the Virginia House of Delegates.

Retirements
Five incumbents did not seek re-election either to retire or to seek other positions.

Democrats
One Democrat did not seek re-election.
District 51: Hala Ayala retired to run for lieutenant governor.

Republicans
Four Republicans did not seek re-election.
District 7: Nick Rush retired.
District 66: Kirk Cox retired to run for governor.
District 82: Jason Miyares retired to run for attorney general.
District 88: Mark Cole retired.

Incumbents defeated

In primary elections

Democrats 

Four Democrats lost renomination.

 District 45: Mark Levine lost renomination to Elizabeth Bennett-Parker, who went on to win the general election.
 District 50: Lee J. Carter lost renomination to Michelle Maldonado, who went on to win the general election.
 District 79: Steve Heretick lost renomination to Nadarius Clark, who went on to win the general election.
 District 86: Ibraheem Samirah lost renomination to Irene Shin, who went on to win the general election.

Republicans 

One Republican lost renomination.

 District 9: Charles Poindexter lost renomination to Wren Williams, who went on to win the general election.

In general elections

Democrats 

Seven Democrats lost re-election to Republicans.

 District 12: Chris Hurst (first elected in 2017) lost to Jason Ballard.
 District 28: Joshua G. Cole (first elected in 2019) lost to Tara Durant.
 District 63: Lashrecse Aird (first elected in 2015) lost to Kim Taylor.
 District 75: Roslyn Tyler (first elected in 2005) lost to Otto Wachsmann.
 District 83: Nancy Guy (first elected in 2019) lost to Tim Anderson.
 District 85: Alex Askew (first elected in 2019) lost to Karen Greenhalgh.
 District 91: Martha Mugler (first elected in 2019) lost to A.C. Cordoza.

Republicans 

No Republicans lost re-election.

Special elections
There were two special elections in 2021 to the 161st Virginia General Assembly, both held on January 5.

District 90 
Incumbent Democrat Joseph C. Lindsey, first elected in a 2014 special election, retired on November 10, 2020.

District 2 
Incumbent Democrat Jennifer Carroll Foy, first elected in 2017, retired on December 12, 2020 to run for governor.

Predictions

Results

Overview 
The Republican Party showed a strong performance in 2021, gaining seven seats over the Democrats. Due to close races in Districts 85 and 91, recounts were requested by Democrats Alex Askew and Martha Mugler, who fell in close second places to their Republican challengers. On December 3, 2021, the recount in District 85 reaffirmed the victory of Republican Karen Greenhalgh, giving the Republican Party a majority in the House of Delegates and ending the Democratic Party's control over the chamber. District 91's recount, which took place on December 7, resulted in victory for Republican candidate A.C. Cordoza, making the final seat count 52 Republicans to 48 Democrats.

Both major parties fielded a record high number of candidates, with Republicans contesting 98 out of the 100 districts, and Democrats contesting 93.

Close races 
Seats where the margin of victory was under 10%:

List of districts

Uncontested primaries are not reported by the Virginia Department of Elections.

District 1
Incumbent Republican Terry Kilgore was first elected in 1993.

District 2
Incumbent Democrat Candi King was first elected in a 2021 special election.

District 3
Incumbent Republican Will Morefield was first elected in 2009.

District 4
Incumbent Republican Will Wampler was first elected in 2019.

District 5
Incumbent Republican Israel O'Quinn was first elected in 2011.

District 6
Incumbent Republican Jeff Campbell was first elected in 2013.

District 7
Incumbent Republican Nick Rush was first elected in 2011. He is retiring.

District 8
Incumbent Republican Joseph McNamara was first elected in a 2018 special election. Democratic challenger Dustin Wimbish withdrew from the race on October 13, but his candidacy remained on the ballot.

District 9
Incumbent Republican Charles Poindexter was first elected in 2007. He lost renomination.

District 10
Incumbent Democrat Wendy Gooditis was first elected in 2017.

District 11
Incumbent Democrat Sam Rasoul was first elected in 2013.

District 12
Incumbent Democrat Chris Hurst was first elected in 2017.

District 13
Incumbent Democrat Danica Roem was first elected in 2017.

District 14
Incumbent Republican Danny Marshall was first elected in 2001.

District 15
Incumbent Republican and House Minority Leader Todd Gilbert was first elected in 2005.

District 16
Incumbent Republican Les Adams was first elected in 2013.

District 17
Incumbent Republican Chris Head was first elected in 2011.

District 18
Incumbent Republican Michael Webert was first elected in 2011.

District 19
Incumbent Republican Terry Austin was first elected in 2013.

District 20
Incumbent Republican John Avoli was first elected in 2019.

District 21
Incumbent Democrat Kelly Convirs-Fowler was first elected in 2017.

District 22
Incumbent Republican Kathy Byron was first elected in 1997.

District 23
Incumbent Republican Wendell Walker was first elected in 2019.

District 24
Incumbent Republican Ronnie R. Campbell was first elected in a 2018 special election.

District 25
Incumbent Republican Chris Runion was first elected in 2019.

District 26
Incumbent Republican Tony Wilt was first elected in a 2010 special election.

District 27
Incumbent Republican Roxann Robinson was first elected in a 2010 special election.

District 28
Incumbent Democrat Joshua G. Cole was first elected in 2019.

District 29
Incumbent Republican Bill Wiley was first elected in a 2020 special election.

District 30
Incumbent Republican Nick Freitas was first elected in 2015.

District 31
Incumbent Democrat Elizabeth Guzmán was first elected in 2017.

District 32
Incumbent Democrat David A. Reid was first elected in 2017.

District 33
Incumbent  Republican Dave LaRock was first elected in 2013.

District 34
Incumbent Democrat Kathleen Murphy was first elected in a 2015 special election.

District 35
Incumbent Democrat Mark Keam was first elected in 2009.

District 36
Incumbent Democrat Kenneth R. Plum was first elected in 1981.

District 37
Incumbent Democrat David Bulova was first elected in 2005.

District 38
Incumbent Democrat Kaye Kory was first elected in 2009.

District 39
Incumbent Democrat Vivian Watts was first elected in 1995.

District 40
Incumbent Democrat Dan Helmer was first elected in 2019.

District 41
Incumbent Democrat and Speaker of the House Eileen Filler-Corn was first elected in a 2010 special election.

District 42
Incumbent Democrat Kathy Tran was first elected in 2017.

District 43
Incumbent Democrat Mark Sickles was first elected in 2003.

District 44
Incumbent Democrat Paul Krizek was first elected in 2015.

District 45
Incumbent Democrat Mark Levine was first elected in 2015. He lost renomination.

District 46
Incumbent Democrat and House Majority Leader Charniele Herring was first elected in 2009.

District 47
Incumbent Democrat Patrick Hope  was first elected in 2009.

District 48
Incumbent Democrat Rip Sullivan  was first elected in a 2014 special election.

District 49
Incumbent Democrat and House Majority Whip Alfonso H. Lopez was first elected in 2011.

District 50
Incumbent Democrat Lee J. Carter was first elected in 2017. He lost renomination.

District 51
Incumbent Democrat Hala Ayala was first elected in 2017. She is retiring to run for lieutenant governor.

District 52
Incumbent Democrat Luke Torian was first elected in 2009.

District 53
Incumbent Democrat Marcus Simon was first elected in 2013.

District 54
Incumbent Republican Bobby Orrock was first elected in 1989.

District 55
Incumbent Republican Buddy Fowler was first elected in 2013.

District 56
Incumbent Republican John McGuire was first elected in 2017.

District 57
Incumbent Democrat Sally L. Hudson was first elected in 2019.

District 58
Incumbent Republican Rob Bell was first elected in 2001.

District 59
Incumbent Republican Matt Fariss was first elected in 2011.

District 60
Incumbent Republican James E. Edmunds was first elected in 2019.

District 61
Incumbent Republican Thomas C. Wright was first elected in a 2000 special election.

District 62
Incumbent Republican Carrie Coyner was first elected in 2019.

District 63
Incumbent Democrat Lashrecse Aird was first elected in 2015.

District 64
Incumbent Republican Emily Brewer was first elected in 2017.

District 65
Incumbent Republican Lee Ware was first elected in a 1998 special election.

District 66
Incumbent Republican Kirk Cox was first elected in 1989. He is retiring to run for governor.

District 67
Incumbent Democrat Karrie Delaney was first elected in 2017.

District 68
Incumbent Democrat Dawn Adams was first elected in 2017.

District 69
Incumbent Democrat Betsy B. Carr was first elected in 2009.

District 70
Incumbent Democrat Delores McQuinn was first elected in 2009.

District 71
Incumbent Democrat Jeff Bourne was first elected in 2017.

District 72
Incumbent Democrat Schuyler VanValkenburg was first elected in 2017.

District 73
Incumbent Democrat Rodney Willett was first elected in 2019.

District 74
Incumbent Democrat Lamont Bagby was first elected in 2015.

District 75
Incumbent Democrat Roslyn Tyler was first elected in 2005.

District 76
Incumbent Democrat Clinton Jenkins was first elected in 2019.

District 77
Incumbent Democrat Cliff Hayes Jr. was first elected in a 2016 special election.

District 78
Incumbent Republican Jay Leftwich was first elected in 2013.

District 79
Incumbent Democrat Steve Heretick was first elected in 2015. He lost renomination.

District 80
Incumbent Democrat Don Scott was first elected in 2019.

District 81
Incumbent Republican Barry Knight was first elected in 2009.

District 82
Incumbent Republican Jason Miyares was first elected in 2015. He is retiring to run for attorney general.

District 83
Incumbent Democrat Nancy Guy was first elected in 2019.

District 84
Incumbent Republican Glenn Davis was first elected in 2013.

District 85
Incumbent Democrat Alex Askew was first elected in 2019.

District 86
Incumbent Democrat Ibraheem Samirah was first elected in 2019. He lost renomination to Irene Shin, who was elected with 65.4% of the vote.

District 87
Incumbent Democrat Suhas Subramanyam was first elected in 2019.

District 88
Incumbent Republican Mark Cole was first elected in 2001. He is retiring.

District 89
Incumbent Democrat Jay Jones was first elected in 2017.

District 90
Incumbent Democrat Angelia Williams Graves was first elected in a 2021 special election.

District 91
Incumbent Democrat Martha Mugler was first elected in 2019.

District 92
Incumbent Democrat Jeion Ward was first elected in 2019.

District 93
Incumbent Democrat Michael P. Mullin was first elected in a 2016 special election.

District 94
Incumbent Democrat Shelly Simonds was first elected in 2019.

District 95
Incumbent Democrat Marcia Price was first elected in 2015.

District 96
Incumbent Republican Amanda Batten was first elected in 2019.

District 97
Incumbent Republican Scott Wyatt was first elected in 2019.

District 98
Incumbent Republican Keith Hodges was first elected in 2011.

District 99
Incumbent Republican Margaret Ransone was first elected in 2011.

District 100
Incumbent Republican Robert Bloxom Jr. was first elected in 2014.

See also 

 2021 Virginia gubernatorial election
 2021 Virginia lieutenant gubernatorial election
 2021 Virginia Attorney General election

References 

Virginia House of Delegates
2021 Virginia elections
November 2021 events in the United States
Virginia House of Delegates elections